The Greater Short-Horned Lizard (Phrynosoma hernandesi), also commonly known as the Mountain Short-Horned Lizard, is a species of lizard endemic to western North America. Like other horned lizards, it is often called a "horned toad" or "horny toad", but it is not a toad at all. It is a reptile, not an amphibian. It is one of seven native species of lizards in Canada.

Etymology
The specific name, hernandesi, honors Francisco Hernández (1514–1587) a Spanish physician who wrote an early account of a horned lizard, which was published in 1615.

Identification
The greater short-horned lizard is often mistaken for its close relative the pygmy short-horned lizard (Phrynosoma douglasii ), which has the same basic body type consisting of small pointed scales around the head and back.  Until recent mitochondrial DNA evidence, P. hernandesi was considered to be the same species as P. douglasii. They are now considered distinct species with the pygmy short-horned lizard (P. douglasii ) occupying the northwest portion of the United States and extreme southern British Columbia.  When placed together the two are easily distinguished at full size, the pygmy short-horned lizard being much smaller. P. hernandesi is a highly variable species with different geographic populations exhibiting differences in color, pattern and size with some authorities describing five subspecies.

The greater short-horned lizard ranges in size from 2 to 5 inches (5.1 to 12.7 cm) in snout to vent length (SVL) and is a flat-bodied, squat lizard with scales around the top of the head, normally called a "crown". They have a snub-nosed profile and short legs. The trunk is fringed by one row of pointed scales, while the belly scales are smooth. The color is gray, yellowish, or reddish-brown, and there are two rows of large dark spots on the back. When threatened or aggressive, their colors become more intense.

Females grow to larger sizes than males: females average about 7 cm (about 2.75 inches) from snout to vent, with a maximum total length of about 15 cm (about 6 inches), and weigh about 18 g; whereas males have an SVL of only about 5 cm (about 2 inches), and weigh on the average about 10 g. The adult male dermatocranial shape resembles that to be expected of a subadult female of the same body size.

Behavior

Short-horned lizards are "sit-and-wait" predators. They feed primarily on ants, but also take an occasional grasshopper or beetle. Often, they can be found sitting in the vicinity of a nest or trails. They are diurnal creatures being most active during the evening and burrowing at night. They rely extensively on camouflage to avoid predators. If provoked, some horned lizards can build up blood pressure in regions behind their eyes and accurately squirt their blood at attacking predators, which will deter canids from continuing their attack.  It is rare for horned lizards to squirt blood at humans however, reserving this unique defense primarily for canids (i.e. foxes, coyotes, dogs), which have a strong reaction of distaste to the blood. Squirting blood has been observed in greater short-horned lizards, but has not been observed in pygmy short-horned lizards.

Reproduction
The mating season for this species is in spring (May to June). They are viviparous, giving live birth: the female births five to 48 offspring from July to September. The young measure about 24 mm from snout to vent and weigh each about 1 g. The young have no horns yet and are able to take care of themselves within a few hours; they are not able to fully crawl until they are a day old. Males become sexually active after their first year of life and females generally take two years before they can start reproducing.

Distribution 

The greater short-horned lizard is the most widely distributed lizard in North America and occurs in the widest range of habitats: West into central Nevada, east into North and South Dakota, north to southern Saskatchewan and Alberta, and then south into the Texas Panhandle to central Mexico. This species of lizard is mostly an arid mountain dweller living in the range of 900–11,300 feet (170–3440 m). It is the only member of its genus in Wyoming, which counts Phrynosoma as its state reptile. It is also considered an endangered species in Saskatchewan and Alberta.

Habitat
The greater short-horned lizard occupies ranges from semiarid plains to high elevations in the mountains. This species is frequently found in a wide range of habitats like shortgrass prairies, sagebrush deserts, and juniper, pine, or fir forests. The soil in these habitats can be stony or rocky but usually has fine loose soil or sand present. The greater short-horned lizard is more cold tolerant than other species and is able to reach higher elevations and a greater distribution where the temperature is much cooler.

References

Phrynosoma
Reptiles of Mexico
Lizards of North America
Fauna of the Western United States
Reptiles of Canada
Reptiles described in 1858